Arshi Khan, is an Indian model, actress, internet celebrity and reality television personality. She joined the Indian National Congress party to contest the 2019 elections for Mumbai.

Early life
Khan was a qualified physiotherapist before she started pursuing a career in acting and modelling.

Personal life 
Khan and her family moved to India from Afghanistan when Khan was four years old. Khan did her schooling and graduation at Bhopal. Later, Khan went to Mumbai to try her luck in acting and modelling.

Recently, Khan opened up about her hardships moving to Mumbai after eviction from Bigg Boss 14.

Career 
She was chosen to portray a lead role in India's first mainline Bollywood 4D historical action film titled "The Last Emperor". She has also appeared in the Tamil film Malli Mishtu. In 2017, she was one of the participants in the reality television show Bigg Boss 11. She was earlier considered to participate in the last two seasons of the show. During her appearances on the show, she was Google India's second-most searched entertainer of 2017.

Arshi who had joined Indian National Congress resigned due to professional commitments.

In 2018, Arshi featured in a Punjabi Music video- Nakhre. Khan has  featured in 5 music videos that include "Bandi", which has already gained 4.2 million on YouTube and Nain Nasheele which already has started to hit 2 million worldwide.

She was a participant in Bigg Boss 14, where she joined in as one of the four challenger participants.

Arshi joined The Great Khali's wrestling school CWE in 2021.

Controversies 
In September 2015, Khan claimed to be in a relationship with Pakistani cricketer Shahid Afridi. In the same year she said that self-proclaimed spiritual leader Radhe Maa ran a prostitution ring, and that she had been approached to join it.

In 2016, the mufti of a madrassa in Pakistan issued a fatwa against Khan after she posted pictures of herself to Facebook wearing a bikini with a hijab, with another photo of herself in a burkha, after which her Facebook account was blocked.

During her stay in Bigg Boss house, an arrest warrant was issued against her by a court in Jalandhar, which according to the sources was due to allegations. Also, during Khan stay actress-model Gehana Vasisth claimed that Khan has been faking everything about her age, qualifications, and relationship with Shahid Afridi and is married to a 50-year-old man.

In 2018, Khan claimed that she was boosted out of Fear Factor: Khatron Ke Khiladi on Vikas Gupta behest and fan made theories comparing the situation Khan was in with Shilpa Shinde previous controversy with the referenced producer.

In 2021, Khan was criticized and trolled for copying Lady Gaga and wearing a rip-off of her 2020 MTV Video Music Awards dress at Bigg Boss 14 afterparty.

In March 2021, Khan was being criticized badly after posting a post about Mufti Menk and said that he's a Islamic salesman.

Filmography

Television

Special appearances

Web series

Music videos

Awards and nominations

References

Arshi Khan will participate for the first time in the "Ullu Web Series". Hotspot Mail Trail 2022.

External links

Living people
Year of birth missing (living people)
Actresses from Bhopal
Female models from Madhya Pradesh
Indian people of Afghan descent
Indian people of Pashtun descent
Indian film actresses
Indian television actresses
Indian web series actresses
Actresses in Hindi cinema
Actresses in Hindi television
Bigg Boss (Hindi TV series) contestants
Indian actor-politicians
21st-century Indian actresses